The Suspens (English: Suspense) is a French sailboat that was designed by Joubert Nivelt Design as a racer-cruiser and first built in 1979.

Production
The design was built by Archambault Boats of Dangé-Saint-Romain, France. The production run was eight years, from 1979 to 1987, with 63 boats completed, but it is now out of production.

Design
The Suspens is a recreational keelboat, built predominantly of fibreglass. It has a 7/8 fractional sloop rig with aluminum spars, a keel-stepped mast, wire standing rigging and a single set of swept spreaders. The hull has a raked stem, a sharply reverse transom, an internally mounted spade-type rudder controlled by a tiller and a fixed fin keel. It displaces  and carries  of cast iron ballast.

The design has sleeping accommodation for six people, with a double "V"-berth in the bow cabin, an "L"-shaped and a straight settee in the main cabin around a drop leaf table and two aft quarter berths. The galley is located on the starboard side just forward of the companionway ladder. The galley is equipped with a two-burner stove and a stainless steel sink. A navigation station is opposite the galley, on the port side. The head is located just aft of the bow cabin on the port side.

See also
List of sailing boat types

References

Keelboats
1970s sailboat type designs
Sailing yachts
Sailboat type designs by Joubert-Nivelt
Sailboat types built by Archambault Boats